FILM(dzama) is a Canadian short drama film, directed by Deco Dawson and released in 2001. The film is a fictionalized biography of artist Marcel Dzama, as played by Dzama's real-life father Maurice, shot on Super 8 film in a surrealist manner influenced by the films of Salvador Dalí, Luis Buñuel, Man Ray and Guy Maddin.

The film was the fifth and last in Dawson's FILM series of experimental short films, following FILM(luster), FILM(emend), FILM(knout) and FILM(lode).

The film premiered at the 2001 Toronto International Film Festival, where it won the award for Best Canadian Short Film.

References

External links
 

2001 films
2001 short films
2000s English-language films
Canadian drama short films
2000s Canadian films
Canadian avant-garde and experimental short films